is a former Japanese football player.

Playing career
Sakamoto was born in Yamanashi Prefecture on August 26, 1971. After graduating from Meiji University, he joined Japan Football League club Kofu SC (later Ventforet Kofu) based in his local in 1994. He played many matches as goalkeeper and the club was promoted to J2 League from 1999. However he could not play at all in the match behind Tomohiko Ito in 2000 and retired end of 2000 season.

Club statistics

References

External links

1971 births
Living people
Meiji University alumni
Association football people from Yamanashi Prefecture
Japanese footballers
J2 League players
Japan Football League (1992–1998) players
Ventforet Kofu players
Association football goalkeepers